David Burns (born 26 April 1959 in Glasgow, Scotland) is a British radio presenter working for the BBC. He is best known for his sports commentary, analysis and discussion on BBC Radio Humberside.

Biography
He is currently the presenter of the mid-morning programme at BBC Radio Humberside. He also commentates on Hull City games, where he is affectionately known as Burnsy.

His co-presenters on air are Gwilym Lloyd, Matt Dean and Mike White. He is also regularly joined by former Hull City, Scunthorpe United and Grimsby Town players – notably Peter Swan and George Kerr.
In May 2011, the sports team of David Burns, John Tondeur, Matt Dean, Mike White and John Anguish won a Sony bronze award in the best sports programme category for their coverage of Grimsby Town's relegation.

In mid-2011, he moved to a non-sport daytime programme, discussing the day's news and playing music between 09:00 and 12:00 daily. He continues to present commentary on Hull City, but is no longer active on Sports Talk during weekday evenings.

Awards
 Radio Broadcast Presenter of the Year, Yorkshire and Humber – 2015, 2016, 2017

References

British radio personalities
1959 births
Living people
British association football commentators
Mass media people from Glasgow